Maya Plugins are extensions for the 3D animation software Autodesk Maya. There are plugins for many different areas such as modeling, animation, and rendering. Some of them also interact with external applications (for instance renderers, game engines, or other software packages).

Crowd simulation

Dynamics

Fluid

Import/Export

Modeling

Rendering

Maya plugins

3D graphics software
Computer-aided design software
Animation software
IRIX software